Clarkella is a monotypic genus of flowering plants in the family Rubiaceae. The genus contains only one species, viz. Clarkella nana, which is native to India, China, Uttarakhand, the Western Himalayas, Burma and Thailand.

References

Rubioideae
Flora of West Himalaya
Flora of Myanmar
Flora of Thailand
Flora of China
Environment of Uttarakhand
Monotypic Rubiaceae genera